Jonathan Bepler is an American composer of experimental music perhaps best known for his collaborative work with artists and choreographers, including many years of work with visual artist Matthew Barney. He is also multi-instrumentalist, singer, installation artist, and teacher.

Early life and education
Bepler was born in Media, Pennsylvania. He was self-taught on many instruments by the time he finished high school. His early interests included folk dance music, ancient and world music, jazz, and improvisation. In 1993 he received and M.F.A from Bennington College in Vermont, where he studied composition with Louis Calabro, Joel Chadabe and Vivian Fine, singing with Frank Baker and Theodor Uppman as well as musical performance with Milford Graves, Bill Dixon und Min Tanaka. In the later period of his studies he directed and sang in productions of Baroque opera such as Gluck's Orfeo ed Euridice. He currently resides in Berlin.

Career 

From 1985 to 1996, Bepler was guitarist with the Glenn Branca Ensemble, touring with them through Europe, the United States and Asia. Starting in 1987, his first operas were composed. From 1993, Bepler also dedicated himself to sound installations, as well as to music for drama and dance. He is the composer for The Cremaster Cycle, a series of films created from 1996 to 2002 by Matthew Barney. In 1997, Bepler was baritone soloist at the world premiere of the opera Der Venusmond by Burkhard Stangl at the Empire State Building. He received a Foundation for Contemporary Arts Grants to Artists award in 1999.

In 2000, Bepler worked as a composer at the Berlin Schaubühne am Lehniner Platz with Sasha Waltz and dancers. In 2003, together with John Jasperse he created the piece California for the Festival International de Danse a Cannes. In 2006, the Ensemble Modern premiered his piece Fascia at the Schauspielhaus Frankfurt. Bepler collaborated again with Matthew Barney on the six-hour film 'River of Fundament, was created over 7 years (2006 to 2014), and premiered at the Bavarian State Opera, and at the Brooklyn Academy of Music.

He has taught as professor and artist in residence at such places as the Munich Academy of Fine Arts, Karlsruhe University of Arts and Design, and the University of Arts and Design Offenbach.

Installations 
Automation of Accidental Gestures, sound and sculpture installation with Sue Rees (with guest performers including Fred Lomberg-Holm, Jennifer Monson, Tom Goralnik, and Dan Froot) in New York and Miami, 1992–95
Source to Sound, sound installation, 1993
On Balance, multi-channel audio installation. MoMA PS1, New York, 2000
The Order, Performance installation for the Cremaster cycle exhibition at the Solomon R. Guggenheim Museum, 2003
Double quartet for: together again for the first time, video and sound installation. New York, 2005
Dances for Broken Ensemble, video and sound installation. Cincinnati Contemporary Arts Center, 2007
Curtain Callers, video and sound installation with Ann-Sofi Siden. Royal Dramatic Theater, Stockholm 2012

Compositions 
Innana, dance-opera (with Christina Svane), 1987
The Great Belzoni, cabaret-opera, 1990
Keep Your Hands Off, chamber music for piano, saxophone, cello, bass, guitar and drums, 1997
Primary Orifice for the Glenn Branca Ensemble, 1998
Cremaster 5, Budapest Philharmonic, Adrienne Csengery, soprano in film by Matthew Barney. Budapest, 1993
Ruins, video opera project. Tokyo, 1999
Cremaster 2, Music for film by Matthew Barney. Utah and NY, 1999
S, music for the dance drama by Sasha Waltz. Berlin, 2000
Cremaster 3, Music for film by Matthew Barney. New York, 2002
Transient Symphony: Oratorio for Hillside and Valley, mobile sound track for the Echigo-Tsumari Art Trienniale. Japan, 2003
The Rape of the Sabine Women, video opera project with Eve Sussman. Greece and New York, 2005
Gezeiten, music for the dance drama by Sasha Waltz. Berlin, 2005
Fascia, concert piece for orchestra, children's choir, opera soloists and foley artists. Ensemble Modern. Frankfurt, 2006
Aliens, score for Dance by Luc Dunberry. Grand Theatre Luxembourg, 2008
Les Assistantes, collaboration with choreographer Jennifer Lacey. Paris and Montpellier, 2008
REN Los Angeles, Drum and Bugle Corps, Choir, Mariachi Divas featuring Lila Downs. Site specific performance by Matthew Barney and Jonathan Bepler. Los Angeles, 2008
Jimmy, concert piece for Guitar, Trombone, Viola, Accordion, 2009
Same Unknown, sound score for 9 channel video installation by Ann-Sofi Siden. 2009
Guardian of the Veil, chamber orchestra, marching snares, baglamas, suonas, featuring the Basel Sinfonietta. Theater Basel, 2009
KHU Detroit, operatic multi-site Performance in collaboration with Matthew Barney. Detroit, 2010
Tool is Loot, Trombones, strings, woodwinds, percussion, singer (Bepler). score for Dance with Jennifer Lacey and Wally Cardona. The Kitchen, NYC. 2011
BA New York, 300 voices, Banjo ensemble, String ensemble. performance in collaboration with Matthew Barney. Brooklyn Navy Yard Dry docks, 2013
Divided Chamber Music, for strings, brass, choirs and bodies. Zeche Zollverein, Essen, Germany, 2014
Within Between, live score for dance by John Jasperse. 6 channel sound. NYLA, NYC, 2014
River of Fundament, 6-hour work with many musical ensembles. Operatic film by Matthew Barney and Jonathan Bepler. Munich and NYC, 2014
Ca Va Bien, Mayakovsky, 5 movements for orchestra and vocal soloists. Orchestra and Choir of Radio France, Paris, 2017
Redoubt, score for film by Matthew Barney, 2018

Discography 
 Masterpieces of Fantasy, 1997
 Music for Cremaster 5, Original Soundtrack Recording, 1998
 Alternative Schubertiade (Anthology), 1999
 Music for Cremaster 2, 1999
 State of the Union (Anthology), 2001
The Order, 2002
 Music for Cremaster 3, 2002
 Transient Symphony, 2003

External links 
 Jonathan Bepler's Homepage

References 

1959 births
20th-century classical composers
21st-century American composers
21st-century classical composers
American classical composers
American male classical composers
American opera composers
Male opera composers
Bennington College alumni
Living people
People from Media, Pennsylvania
20th-century American composers
20th-century American male musicians
21st-century American male musicians